&Team (stylized in all caps) is a multinational boy band, the first to debut from Hybe Labels Japan.  The group is composed of nine members: K, Nicholas, EJ, Taki, Jo, Harua, Maki, Yuma, and Fuma. &Team was formed through the reality-survival program &Audition – The Howling. The group released their debut single "Under the Skin" on November 21, 2022, and officially debuted with their first extended play First Howling: ME on December 7, 2022.

Name 
The group name "&TEAM" refers to '9 diverse members forming a team and connecting diverse worlds'. They aim to be a group that grows while running towards tomorrow.

History

2020–2022: Pre-debut activities and formation 
K, Nicholas, EJ and Taki competed on the South Korean survival show I-Land in 2020 which produced boy-group Enhypen. On January 1, 2021, Big Hit Japan announced the launch of the "Big Hit Japan Global Debut Project" to search for artists to debut as a group in Japan and become active worldwide. On March 19, Big Hit Entertainment re-branded and re-structured into Hybe Corporation.  On April 26, K and EJ made cameo appearances in the music video for Enhypen's "Drunk-Dazed".

On November 4, it was announced that K, Nicholas, EJ and Taki would participate as confirmed members of the planned group and would be joined by additional trainees to be selected through a new audition program. &Audition – The Howling began airing on July 9, 2022, and the nine final members were unveiled on September 3 via live broadcast from Tokyo.

2022–present: Debut with First Howling: Me
Hybe Labels Japan announced that &Team would release their debut extended play (EP), First Howling: ME on December 7, 2022.

The group's self-variety show, &TEAM学園, (stylized and pronounced: &TEAM Gakuen) started airing on November 12; various guests were invited while viewers were able to see their debut preparations in Korea and Japan.

On November 21, 2022, &Team released their first music video and digital single titled "Under the Skin. On December 5, 2022, a webtoon based on &Team titled "Dark Moon: The Grey City" was released. On December 7, 2022, &Team made their official debut, releasing the music video for "Scent of You". Within the first week of its release, First Howling: ME sold 151,000 copies.

Members 
 
  – sub leader
 
  – leader

Discography

Extended plays

Singles

Filmography

Reality Programs

Videography

Music videos

Awards and nominations

Performances

Showcase 
 &Team Debut Showcase 'First Howling: ME' (December 8, 2022, Tokyo Metropolitan Gymnasium) YouTube: Hybe Labels

Other events

References

External links 
 

Hybe Corporation artists
Universal Music Japan artists
2022 establishments in Japan
Japanese boy bands
Japanese dance music groups
Japanese idol groups
Japanese pop music groups
Musical groups established in 2022
Singing talent show winners